Clarence Pettersen (July 25, 1952 – March 28, 2018) was a Canadian provincial politician, who was elected to the Legislative Assembly of Manitoba in the 2011 election. He represented the electoral district of Flin Flon as a member of the Manitoba New Democratic Party caucus.

Pettersen lost the Flin Flon constituency renomination in December 2015, and announced his candidacy as an Independent candidate for the April 19, 2016 provincial election on March 15, 2016. Pettersen was defeated in the 2016 election by NDP candidate Tom Lindsey. Pettersen finished fourth in the riding, coming behind the NDP, Progressive Conservative, and Liberal candidates. Pettersen died of cancer on March 28, 2018, at the age of 65.

Electoral history

References

1952 births
2018 deaths
New Democratic Party of Manitoba MLAs
21st-century Canadian politicians
People from Flin Flon
Deaths from cancer in Manitoba